The 2005 3000 Pro Series was the inaugural season of what later would become the International Formula Master racing series. The season consisted of eight rounds, beginning on 10 April at the ACI Vallelunga Circuit and finishing on 9 October at the Autodromo Nazionale Monza. 10 different teams and 26 different drivers competed. In this one-make formula all drivers had to utilize Lola B99/50 chassis and Zytek engines. It was won jointly by Austrian Norbert Siedler and Italian Massimiliano Busnelli.

Teams and drivers

Race calendar

Championship Standings

Drivers

Points were awarded to the top eight classified finishers using the following structure:

NOTE - Siedler and Busnelli could not be separated by race finishing positions. Siedler had the better qualifying record but it was decided that the title would be shared.

Teams

References

External links
Speedsport Magazine

3000
International Formula Master seasons
3000 Pro Series